Cary Brabham (born August 11, 1970) is a former American football defensive back. He played for the Los Angeles Raiders in 1994.

References

1970 births
Living people
American football defensive backs
SMU Mustangs football players
Los Angeles Raiders players
Carolina Panthers players